Deadliest Catch is a reality television series that premiered on the Discovery Channel on April 12, 2005. The show follows crab fishermen aboard fishing vessels in the Bering Sea during the Alaskan king crab and snow crab fishing seasons. The base of operations for the fishing fleet is the Aleutian Islands port of Dutch Harbor, Alaska. Produced for the Discovery Channel, the show's title is derived from the inherent high risk of injury or death associated with this line of work.

Premiere
Deadliest Catch premiered on the Discovery Channel in 2005 and currently airs worldwide. The first season consisted of ten episodes, with the finale airing on June 14, 2005. Subsequent seasons have aired on the same April to June or July schedule every year since. On March 7, 2019, the Discovery Channel announced that the series was renewed for a fifteenth season, which premiered on April 9, 2019.

The show's 18th season premiered on April 19, 2022 and was simulcast on Discovery Channel and the streaming service Discovery+.

Format 
The series follows a fisherman's life on the Bering Sea aboard various crab fishing boats during two of the crab fishing seasons, the October king crab season and the January opilio crab season. The show emphasizes the dangers on deck to the fishermen and camera crews  as they duck heavy crab pots swinging into position, maneuver hundreds of pounds of crab across a deck strewn with hazards, and lean over the rails to position pots for launch or retrieval, while gale-force winds and high waves lash the deck constantly.

Each episode focuses on a story, situation, or theme that occurs on one or more boats. In contrast, side stories delve into the backgrounds and activities of one or two crew members, particularly the "greenhorns" (rookie crew members) on several boats. The fleet's captains are featured prominently, highlighting their camaraderie with their fellow captains and relationships with their crews, as well as their competition with other boats in the hunt for crab. Common themes include friendly rivalries among the captains (particularly between Sig Hansen of the F/V Northwestern, and Johnathan and Andy Hillstrand of the F/V Time Bandit), the familial ties throughout the fleet (brothers Sig, Norm, and Edgar Hansen, who own the Northwestern; the Hillstrand brothers and Johnathan's son Scotty on the F/V Time Bandit; brothers Keith and Monte Colburn of the Wizard), the stresses of life on the Bering Sea, and the high burnout rate among greenhorns.

Because Alaskan Crab Fishing is one of the most dangerous jobs in the world, the U.S. Coast Guard rescue helicopters stationed at Integrated Support Command Kodiak (Kodiak, Alaska) and their outpost on St. Paul Island, near the northern end of the crab fishing grounds, are frequently shown rescuing crab boat crew members who fall victim to the harsh conditions on the Bering Sea. The USCG rescue squad was featured prominently during the episodes surrounding the loss of F/V Big Valley in January 2005, the loss of F/V Ocean Challenger in October 2006, and the loss of F/V Katmai in October 2008. Original Productions keeps a camera crew stationed with the Coast Guard during the filming of the show in preparation for such occurrences.

Narration 
The show has no on-camera host. A narrator provides commentary connecting the storylines as the show shifts from one boat to another. Discovery Channel voice artist Mike Rowe narrates the action for North American airings. In the UK, voice artist Bill Petrie serves as narrator. The show transitions between boats using a mock-up radar screen that shows the positions of the ships relative to one another and the two ends of the fishing grounds, St. Paul Island to the north and Dutch Harbor to the south.

Rowe was originally supposed to be the on-camera host, and he appeared in taped footage as himself during the first season of shooting. As filming of the first season was nearing completion, Discovery greenlit production on another Rowe project, Dirty Jobs, under the condition that Rowe chose only one show on which to appear on camera. Most of the footage Rowe shot during the first season became part of the first season's "Behind the Scenes" episode. After the third season of Deadliest Catch, Rowe began hosting a post-season behind-the-scenes miniseries entitled After the Catch, which is a roundtable discussion featuring the captains relating their experiences filming the previous season's episodes.

Changes required for parental guidance ratings 
Because Deadliest Catch is essentially a filmed record of everyday life in a stressful working environment, the producers have to censor gestures and language deemed inappropriate for television audiences. For example, under the U.S. Television rating system, Deadliest Catch is rated TV-14 with inappropriate language ("L") as a highlighted concern. For visual disguise of such items as finger gestures, bloody injuries, or non-featured crew member anonymity, the producers use the traditional pixelization or blurring. However, due to the volume of profanities used in the course of crew member conversation, the producers occasionally employ alternate methods of censoring profanities, such as using sound effects in place of the traditional "bleep."

Subject matter

Dangers of commercial fishing 
Commercial fishing has long been considered one of the most dangerous jobs in America. In 2006, the Bureau of Labor Statistics ranked commercial fishing as the job occupation with the highest fatality rate with 141.7 per 100,000, almost 75% higher than the fatality rate for pilots, flight engineers, and loggers, the next most hazardous occupations. However, Alaskan king crab fishing is considered even more dangerous than the average commercial fishing job, due to the conditions on the Bering Sea during the seasons when they fish for crab. According to the pilot episode, the death rate during the main crab seasons averages out to nearly one fisherman per week, while the injury rate for crews on most crab boats is nearly 100% due to the severe weather conditions (frigid gales, rogue waves, ice formations on and around the boat) and the danger of working with such heavy machinery on a constantly rolling boat deck. Alaskan king crab fishing reported over 300 fatalities per 100,000 as of 2005, with over 80% of those deaths caused by drowning or hypothermia.

Rationalization: derby vs. quota 
The series' first season was shot during the final year of the derby style king crab fishery. The subsequent seasons have been set after a change to the quota system as part of a process known as "rationalization". Under the old derby style, a large number of crews competed with each other to catch crab during a restrictive time window. Under the new Individual Fishing Quota (IFQ) system, established owners, such as those shown on the series, have been given quotas that they can fill at a more relaxed pace. In theory, it is intended to be safer, which was the main rationale for the change in the fishing rules. The transition to the quota system was also expected to increase the value of crab by limiting the market of available crab. An influx of foreign crab negated some of these gains during the 2006 season.
The rationalization process put many crews out of work because the owners of many small boats found their assigned quotas too small to meet operating expenses. During the first season run under the IFQ system, the fleet shrank from over 250 boats to about 89 larger boats with high quotas.

Society of Fishermen 
One of the series' main features is the portrayal of the harsh life at sea, including the behavior and mannerisms of the fishermen who are engaged in a hazardous lifestyle with little tolerance for low performance or ineptitude. Several of the series' shows have featured "greenhorn" fishermen who are usually the brunt of harsh criticism and sometimes bullying by veteran deckhands. In one case, a new fisherman entered a ship's bridge to berate his captain for what he saw as unfair comments (the fisherman was fired as soon as the ship returned to port). Another filmed incident was a fight on board the fishing vessel Wizard in which a greenhorn sailor sucker punched a veteran fisherman who had been engaged in harassment and bullying. Again, the greenhorn was fired as soon as the ship hit port, leading to mixed reactions by fans of the show.

Production

Technical 
The Behind the Scenes special provided insight on how the program is produced. A two-person TV crew lives on each boat profiled. They use handheld Sony HVR-Z5U and HVR-Z7U HDV cameras to shoot most of the series (one on the main deck, one in the wheelhouse). Additional footage is provided by four stationary cameras that are permanently mounted around the ship and are constantly recording. Shots from vantage points outside the boat are accomplished through a variety of methods, including the use of a helicopter for footage near the harbor and a cameraman on a chase boat (in season 1, the main chase boat was the F/V Time Bandit). The crew also makes use of underwater cameras, including one attached to a crab pot for a "crab's eye view" of the pot being retrieved in season 2, one mounted in the main crab tank on the F/V Northwestern beginning in season 2, and one mounted to a submersible watercraft beginning in season 3. The Season 9 "Behind the Lens" special shows two more filming methods: divers near the boats (and on the bottom of Dutch Harbor for the king crab fleet departure), and a helicopter with a belly-mounted turret camera (same as that used to film scenes in Skyfall).

Because of a lack of space on the boats, the crews do not have an audio mixer. Audio is recorded using wireless microphones worn by the fishermen and shotgun microphones attached to the cameras. In audio post-production, the sound team attempts to use actual sounds that were recorded on the boats.

Although the equipment is carefully waterproofed, the cameras are routinely damaged by corrosion, ice and accidents.

Captain Sig Hansen of the F/V Northwestern, serves as a technical advisor to the series' producers.

Filming 
Shooting episodes of Deadliest Catch is a dangerous occupation for the camera crews on board the boats. In the early seasons, when many of the camera crews had little or no experience on crab boats, they frequently ran into dangers not normally encountered when shooting a documentary. F/V Northwestern captain Sig Hansen told talk show host Jimmy Kimmel that he saved a cameraman's life during the first season, screaming at him to get out of the way just seconds before a 900-pound crab pot swinging from a crane crossed the space where the cameraman was standing. In another incident, showcased on the behind the scenes special, an inattentive cameraman had his leg fall through an open hatch on the deck of one of the boats when he unwittingly stepped into the hole, suffering three broken ribs (and, according to the cameraman, having to buy a case of beer for the entire crew as per tradition on crab boats).

Personal and sensitive situations 
Interactions between the film crew and the fishermen appear in the show occasionally. During an episode of season 4, Wizard captain Keith Colburn demanded that cameras be turned off when he got into a heated argument with his brother Monte. The cameras were turned off, but the Colburn's neglected to remove their wireless mics, and the subsequent exchange was recorded and featured in the episode. Also, in season 4, F/V Cornelia Marie Captain Phil Harris asked the cameraman filming him not to tell anyone else about his injuries, for fear it would stall his fishing. Later on, crew member and later acting captain Murray Gamrath, concerned for Phil's well-being, asked a cameraman to keep an eye on him and to report any problem. During season 5, the camera crew on the Northwestern were requested not to film crew member Jake Anderson being informed of his sister's death, which the camera crew honored.

On September 28, 2010, it was reported that three of the principal captains featured throughout the series' run, the brothers Andy and Johnathan Hillstrand and Sig Hansen, would not return to the show due to litigation initiated by Discovery Communications involving the Hillstrands. On October 8, 2010, it was announced that the three captains had reached an agreement with Discovery and would return for the seventh season.

The death of Captain Phil Harris 
On January 29, 2010, as Original Productions' crews shot footage for season 6 of the F/V Cornelia Marie offloading C. opilio crab at St. Paul Island, Captain Phil Harris, who had earlier complained of being excessively tired, went to his stateroom to retrieve pain medicines and collapsed after suffering a stroke. Second-year Engineer Steve Ward discovered him on the floor of his stateroom, conscious but unable to move his left leg or his left hand. Ward immediately got Phil's sons, Josh and Jake, to come to his stateroom while he called for paramedics. According to Thom Beers, producer and creator of Deadliest Catch, Harris insisted that the camera crews continue to film him. "We want to remember Phil as who he was," Beers told Zap2it.com writer Kate O'Hare. "We want to remember all the dynamics, but at the same time, the guy was persistent when we were doing this, saying, 'Dude, you've got to. We've got to have an end to the story [about the strength and resiliency of familial bonds, especially the father/son bond]. You want to film this, film this.'" Beers said he honored Harris' wishes and continued to shoot as Harris was airlifted to Anchorage, Alaska, where doctors performed emergency brain surgery to relieve the pressure building up in the cranial vault and avoid further brain damage. Harris spent eleven days in ICU before succumbing to complications from his stroke on February 9, 2010.

The Soul Rebels Brass Band performed a New Orleans style Jazz Funeral for the late Captain Phil Harris on After The Catch.

Vessels

Current fishing vessels 

Harris was forced to leave during the C. opilio season in season 4 due to what turned out to be a pulmonary embolism and his medical issues prevented him from going out during the king crab portion of season 5. Murray Gamrath relieved him as captain in both seasons. A camera crew stayed with Harris both when he was hospitalized in season 4 and after his forced departure at the start of season 5. He continued to make occasional appearances during season 5. Harris suffered a massive stroke on January 29, 2010, during the filming of the C. opilio season for season 6 and died on February 9, 2010, from complications. Derrick Ray took over as captain for the remainder of the season.

Tony Lara, the fourth captain of F/V Cornelia Marie, died on August 8, 2015 in Sturgis, South Dakota, victim of Cardiac arrest while participating in the famed Sturgis Motorcycle Rally, hosted annually in Sturgis.

Sig's brother Edgar occasionally took over as captain for blue king crab or bairdi seasons, and sporadically during the middle of an opilio season up until his removal from the show sometime after season 14.

Johnathan usually served as captain for king crab season while Andy took over as captain during opilio season.

Keith's brother Monte occasionally takes over as captain for bairdi and opilio seasons.

Former fishing vessels 

Not to be confused with former Chicago White Sox , Oakland Athletics and St. Louis Cardinals manager Tony La Russa.

Blake Painter died on May 28, 2018 due to an overdose of heroin. His body was found at his home in Astoria, Oregon.

The boat did have a film crew on board. However, the footage was never broadcast on the U.S version, but it did appear in some international versions.

Fishing vessels with no embedded film crew 

During the shooting of the first season of Deadliest Catch, the F/V Big Valley sank on January 15, 2005, sometime after 0734 Alaska Standard Time when the Coast Guard first detected her EPIRB signal. Five members of the six-man crew perished; three were never found. Cache Seel was the only survivor. Discovery Channel camera crews on the F/V Maverick and F/V Cornelia Marie captured the first footage of the debris field, confirming that the boat had capsized and gone down. The search for the ship is featured in the episode "Dead of Winter."

Non-fishing vessels 

Episodes

Deadliest Catch draws consistently high ratings for Discovery Channel; season 3 attracted more than 49 million viewers throughout the season and over 3 million viewers per first-run episode, making it one of 2007's most successful programs on cable TV.

Overall ratings for season 6 exceeded season 5's by more than 10%; as a result, Deadliest Catch regularly wins its U.S. primetime telecast timeslot (Tuesdays, 9:00-10:00 p.m. EST). Ratings for the season opener "Slow Burn" drew a record 4.6 million viewers; on June 22, 2010, "Blown Off Course", the first of five episodes that dealt with Phil Harris's stroke and its impact, drew 5.2 million viewers, more than 10% over "Slow Burn". On July 13, 2010, the episode "Redemption Day", which dealt with the death of Harris at its close, set another record audience for the show with 8.5 million viewers, making the episode the third-most-viewed broadcast in Discovery Channel's history. In 2016, The New York Times study of the 50 TV shows with the most Facebook Likes found that Deadliest Catch was "most popular in areas that are rural, cold and close to the sea, particularly Alaska and Maine".

Critical response
In 2011, Matt Zoller Seitz of Salon.com praised Deadliest Catch as a reality program that is "really a documentary series about the toll taken by relentless physical labor", and stated that other series trying to emulate it such as Ice Road Truckers and Swamp People "tend to miss the atmosphere and deep attention to psychology that make this series so special."

Related extras

Pilot
The show was created as a regular series after two well-received pilots about Alaskan crabbing were produced by Thom Beers for the Discovery Channel.

The first pilot was a one-hour documentary entitled Deadliest Job in the World, which appeared in 1999. The show, which started with the sinking of the Rosie G (5 on board, all rescued alive), followed the Fierce Allegiance through the 1999 opilio crab season.

The second pilot was a three-part miniseries entitled America's Deadliest Season, which premiered on July 18, 2004, and covered the 2003–04 king and opilio crab seasons. The miniseries followed the vessels F/V Northwestern, Erla-N and Sea Star during king crab, and Erla-N, Saga and Arctic Dawn during opilio crab. The series also features several crises, including the half-capsized Raven (5 on board, all rescued alive), man-overboard calls from Shaman (recovered dead) and Saga (greenhorn Kevin Davis, rescued alive), and the constant threat of cold water and freezing spray.

Beers did the voice-over narration for both series. Discovery picked up the show and ordered an 8-episode season to premiere in 2005. Beers turned the narration duties over to fellow Discovery Channel voice artist Mike Rowe, allowing Beers to continue working on new show development through his production company, Original Productions.

Specials

After the Catch 

After the Catch is a roundtable, documentary-style television mini-series that follows the captains from Deadliest Catch when they're not fishing. The captains and crew members swap stories about the experiences and sights while fishing the Bering Sea. The spin-off series is produced in partnership with Original Productions and Silent Crow Arts. The first season aired in 2007, filmed at the Lockspot Cafe, a bar in Seattle Ballard neighborhood, hosted by Deadliest Catch narrator Mike Rowe. After the Catch II aired in 2008, filmed at Pratty's Bar in Gloucester, Massachusetts and hosted by Rowe. The third season, titled After the Catch III, aired in 2009 and was filmed at RTs Longboard Bar and Grill in San Diego with  Cash Cab Ben Bailey hosting. After the Catch IV aired in 2010 and was filmed at the Blue Nile bar in New Orleans, with Rowe returning as host.

The After the Catch miniseries was one of Discovery Channel's highest-rated miniseries in 2007 and spawned several new after-the-series type follow-up documentaries such as Everest: After the Climb, the 2007 follow-up to Everest: Beyond the Limit.

After the Catch VI was the last season of the post-fishing mini-series. Responding in part to a challenge-in-jest made late in the season by Mike Rowe to the captains to host a show of their own, the format for Season 9 was changed to run throughout the season's air dates. (See The Bait below.)

The Bait 

The Bait is a "pregame show" roundtable documentary-style television mini-series that previews select episodes of Deadliest Catch since season 9, filmed in Dutch Harbor, and hosted by Sig Hansen, Johnathan, and Andy Hillstrand, and Keith Colburn, with narration by Deadliest Catch narrator Mike Rowe. The captains swap stories about the off-season and hints on what the viewers can expect in that night's episode, with previews of the upcoming season in the king crab and opilio crab kickoffs. Regular features include "The Hot Seat" (interview focused on one Captain or deckhand) and questions from celebrity fans of the show. The spin-off series is produced in partnership with Original Productions and Silent Crow Arts. The first episode, "Opening Day: King Crab," aired on April 16, 2013.

On Deck 

On Deck is an expanded episode of Deadliest Catch featuring previously unaired footage, production notes, facts, and on occasion, social media comments. On Deck debuted April 23, 2013, and paralleled Season 9.

Decked 

Decked is a rebroadcast episode of Deadliest Catch featuring webcam CatchChat with one or more Captains between episode segments.

MythBusters Crabtastic Special 
A 2013 episode of MythBusters featured Johnathan Hillstrand and Scott Campbell Jr. traveling to M5 Industries in San Francisco to help bust three myths related to crab fishing: that someone can get caught in a pot's rope as it is dumped and be dragged to the bottom (plausible), that 20-minute naps every 6 hours can double effectiveness over a 30-hour shift (confirmed) and that crab pots are impervious to explosives (busted).

How It's Made Deadliest Catch Edition 
The Discovery/Science documentary program How It's Made showed the production of oceanographic buoys, sushi, rubber boots, and industrial wire ropes in this episode featuring items used in or connected with crab fishing. None of the captains, crew members or vessels appeared in the program.

Books 
In April 2008, Andy and Johnathan Hillstrand, co-captains of the F/V Time Bandit, with Malcolm MacPherson, released a book titled Time Bandit: Two Brothers, the Bering Sea, and One of the World's Deadliest Jobs on their experiences as crab fishermen.

Also, in April 2008, Discovery Channel released the book Deadliest Catch: Desperate Hours. Edited by Larry Erikson, the book contains true stories of life and death at sea, as related by the captains and deckhands featured on the series.

In December 2009, Travis Arket, deckhand of the North American, released a book titled Deadliest Waters: Bering Sea Photography. This book is the first photography collection to be published about Bering Sea crab fishing and includes many people from Deadliest Catch.

In March 2010, Sig Hansen, captain of the F/V Northwestern, released the book North by Northwestern: A Seafaring Family on Deadly Alaskan Waters, co-written with the author Mark Sundeen. The book details the Hansen family's history and that of Norwegian Americans in the fishing industry of the Pacific Northwest.

In April 2013, Josh and Jake Harris released the book Captain Phil Harris: The Legendary Crab Fisherman, Our Hero, Our Dad, co-written with best-selling author Steve Springer and Blake Chavez. The book details the hard and fast life, and death of the hard-working F/V Cornelia Marie crab fisherman, who was described as always openhearted and infectiously friendly, a devoted friend, a loving father, a steadfast captain, and a hero to audiences across America and around the world.

Video games 
In February 2008, Sig Hansen and Liquid Dragon Studios announced the upcoming release of a video game for Xbox 360 and PC inspired by the Deadliest Catch series entitled Deadliest Catch: Alaskan Storm. Liquid Dragon designers spent time with the Hansens on the F/V Northwestern in the safety of Dutch Harbor and out on the Bering Sea to give them a sense of the real conditions that needed to be duplicated in the game. The game itself features the F/V Northwestern, F/V Cornelia Marie, and Sea Star as crab boats that can be chosen by the player, along with the Bering Star and the Shellfish. On June 17, 2008, the game was released in stores around North America.

A second game, titled Deadliest Catch: Sea of Chaos, was announced in June 2010 and released in November 2010. It is developed by DoubleTap Games and published by Crave Entertainment.

A mobile game developed by Tapinator, Inc. named Deadliest Catch: Seas of Fury, launched on July 13, 2015.

Spin-offs

Deadliest Catch: Dungeon Cove 
A spinoff titled Deadliest Catch: Dungeon Cove premiered on September 12, 2016. The series focused on a handful of boat captains and crews fishing for Dungeness crab off the Oregon Coast. The first season consists of eight episodes with the season finale airing on October 18, 2016. Discovery has not made any formal announcement on whether or not the show has been cancelled.

Deadliest Catch: Bloodline 

A spinoff titled Deadliest Catch: Bloodline premiered on April 14, 2020. The series focuses on Josh Harris and Casey McManus exploring the notes Phil Harris left behind on a fishing chart of the Hawaiian Islands and learning to catch Ahi tuna.

Deadliest Catch: The Viking Returns 
A spinoff titled Deadliest Catch: The Viking Returns premiered on September 13, 2022. The series focuses on Sig Hansen and his daughter, Mandy, as they try their hand at fishing off the coast of Norway after the Alaskan red king crab fishery is shut down. Sig brings along son-in-law Clark Pederson, one of his crew members from the F/V Northwestern, to join him and Mandy. In order to catch over $1 million in Norwegian red king crab quota, the Hansen family return to the M/S Stålbas to catch it. Mandy, in order to lure F/V Saga captain and owner Jake Anderson, into going fishing with them, offers him a 10% ownership stake into the business, taken from her own percentage.

Accolades

References

External links 

Deadliest Catch Network at Discovery.com

 
2005 American television series debuts
2000s American reality television series
2010s American reality television series
2020s American reality television series
Discovery Channel original programming
English-language television shows
Fishing television series
Television shows set in Alaska
Commercial fishing in Alaska
Television series by Original Productions
Primetime Emmy Award for Outstanding Reality Program winners
Television series by Lionsgate Television